Nagler is a surname. Notable people with the surname include:

Alfons Nagler (born 1893), German flying ace
Cathryn Nagler, American immunologist
Ellen Torelle Nagler (1870–1965), American biologist, author, lecturer
Eric Nagler (born 1942), American musician
Georg Kaspar Nagler (1801-1866), German art historian
Gerald Nagler (1929-2022), Swedish businessman
Gern Nagler (born 1932), American football wide receiver
Ivan Nagler (born 1999), Italian luger
Judah Nagler (born 1980), American singer
Michael N. Nagler (born 1937), American peace activist
Richard Nagler (born 1947), American businessman
Stephen E. Nagler (born 1956), Canadian physicist

See also
10715 Nagler

Surnames of German origin